The Renfrew County District School Board (RCDSB, known as English-language Public District School Board No. 28 prior to 1999) is the administrative body overseeing the operations of the primary and secondary schools in the County of Renfrew in Ontario, Canada. The administrative office is located in Pembroke, Ontario. Whilst Valour school being the biggest out of the county, located in Petawawa Ontario

Schools
The elementary schools managed by the RCDSB are:

The secondary schools managed by the RCDSB are:

Amalgamation September 2009
The Airy and Sabine District School Area Board and Murchison and Lyell School Board were amalgamated with the RCDSB on September 1, 2009. The former added Whitney Public School, located in the community of Whitney near the east gate of Algonquin Provincial Park, and the latter Madawaska Public School in Madawaska to the RCDSB.

Trustees
Board Trustees for the 2019–2020 academic school year:

Student Trustees

There are two non-voting student trustees who are elected by the executive members of the student councils from the seven high schools. They serve two-year terms, with one trustee being replaced each year. The current students fulfilling the role as Student Trustee are Hudson Arbour of Mackenzie Community School K-12 and Sam Abbott of Valour School K-12.

See also
List of school districts in Ontario
List of high schools in Ontario
Keys Public School

References

Education in Renfrew County
School districts in Ontario
Pembroke, Ontario